The Plano Symphony Orchestra (PSO) is an American symphony orchestra based in Plano, Texas. The orchestra is resident at the Charles W. Eisemann Center for Performing Arts.  It offers a subscription series that combines the music of traditional classical and pops series, as well as a Family Concert Series and the Collin County Young Artist Competition. In addition to its primary venue at the Eisemann Center, the Plano Symphony performs at St. Andrew's Methodist Church as well as various venues in the surrounding area.

History 
The orchestra was founded in 1983 as the Plano Chamber Orchestra; its name was changed to Symphony in 1998. In November 2021, the Symphony received its largest-ever donation of $410,000, which will be used for various improvements including upgrading ticketing systems, creating a new strings section, and underwriting the Symphony's 2022-23 40th anniversary season.

Maestro Hector Guzman has served as the Symphony's music director since its inception. Shira Samuels-Shragg was named as the Assistant Conductor in April 2022.

References

External links 

 Plano Symphony Orchestra official website
 Musicians of the Plano Symphony

Orchestras based in Texas
Texas classical music
Musical groups established in 1983
Plano, Texas